Helmer da Piedade Rosa (born 3 July 1971), commonly known as Zito, is an Angolan former professional footballer who played as a left winger. He played in six matches for the Angola national team in 1997 and 1998. He was also named in Angola's squad for the 1998 African Cup of Nations tournament.

References

External links
 

1971 births
Living people
Angolan footballers
Association football wingers
Angola international footballers
1998 African Cup of Nations players
Primeira Liga players
Liga Portugal 2 players
Amora F.C. players
Seixal F.C. players
Vitória S.C. players
G.D. Chaves players
F.C. Paços de Ferreira players
C.F. Os Belenenses players
S.C. Espinho players
U.S.C. Paredes players
G.D.R.C. Os Sandinenses players
Angolan expatriate footballers
Angolan expatriate sportspeople in Portugal
Expatriate footballers in Portugal
Footballers from Malanje